Coenodomus is a genus of snout moths. It was described by Walsingham in 1888, and is known from India, Papua New Guinea, Bhutan, the Philippines, the United States, Indonesia, China, and Sri Lanka.

Species
 Coenodomus aglossalis
 Coenodomus cornucalis (Kenrick, 1907)
 Coenodomus dudgeoni
 Coenodomus fumosalis Hampson, 1903
 Coenodomus hampsoni West, 1931
 Coenodomus hockingi Walsingham, 1888 
 Coenodomus melanochlora
 Coenodomus rotundinidus
 Coenodomus rubrescens
 Coenodomus schausi
 Coenodomus trichasema  (Hampson, 1916) (from Sri Lanka)

References

Epipaschiinae
Pyralidae genera